The Face Australia Season 1 is an Australian reality television modelling competition series, based upon the American version with the same format. This series follows three supermodel coaches, Cheyenne Tozzi, Naomi Campbell, and Nicole Trunfio as they compete with each other to find 'the face' of Fresh Effects, Olay. The series premiered on 18 March 2014, on Fox8.

Casting
All applicants attempting to enter the competition were required to be female and be over the age of 18 or under the age 30 as of 1 November 2013. Applying contestants were also required to meet the minimum height requirement of 172 cm. Past experience as a model was not a requisite. Those with experience as a model could not have been in any national campaign within previous five years before applying. The deadline for all applications was 22 September 2013.

Contestants
(ages stated are at start of filming)

Episodes

Episode 1: 24 Become 12 
First aired 18 March 2014 
 
Twenty four model hopefuls arrive at the casting of their lives. There they meet the model mentors Cheyenne Tozzi, Naomi Campbell, and Nicole Trunfio, who will each assemble a group of four models to be a part of their team. After half of the contestants are gobbled up in two separate eliminations, the final twelve prepare to compete to become the new face of Olay.

Episode 2: Game On! 
First aired 25 March 2014

Naomi watches the twelve finalists perform in their first test shoot challenge, where they must pose with miscellaneous items in order to win a Givenchy handbag. For the campaign, the teams are styled by their mentors for a Marie Claire editorial. One of the mentors is not pleased by the outcome of the first elimination, and decides to confront Naomi.

 Winning coach and team:  Naomi Campbell 
 Bottom two: Natalie Roser & Shenika Rule
 Eliminated: Natalie Roser
 Special Guests: Jackie Frank

Episode 3: Circus Circus 
First aired 1 April 2014

The remaining eleven models take part in a 'who wore it better' test shoot overseen by Cheyenne. The girls are later taken to a circus, where they learn that they will have to perform in a Max Factor commercial portraying different roles. In a shocking turn of events, one of the models is forced to withdraw from the competition. After the elimination, one of the teams is reduced to just two girls.

 Winning coach and team:  Cheyenne Tozzi 
 Bottom two: Brittaney Johnston & Shenika Rule
 Eliminated: Shenika Rule
 Quit: Susan Yovan

Episode 4: Movement and Fashion 
First aired 8 April 2014

For the challenge, the models must jump on a trampoline to create dynamic body shapes. The winner receives a $1,000 shopping voucher from G Star, who also provides the clothes for the challenge. The girls must later pose with their teams in a sporty Stylerunner photo shoot to create an edgy online advertisement for the brand's website. It's one girls' moment on top of the sun as she is showered with praise from both the client, and her team. Team Nicole receives yet another blow, and Anouska becomes the sole member of her team.

 Winning coach and team:  Naomi Campbell 
 Bottom two: Olivia Donaldson & Melise Williams
 Eliminated: Melise Williams
 Special Guests: Sali Stevanja, Julie Stevanja

Episode 5: Walk the Walk 
First aired 15 April 2014

The models are given two minutes to run back stage, undress, and re-dress into a runway outfit. The winner of the challenge receives a collection from ASOS, along with a feature on Naomi Campbell's website. The contestants later face their biggest campaign yet; walking down 250 steps for a Steven Khalil wedding dress runway show at the Sydney Opera House in front of a crowd of 500 people. The best performing contestants are given the opportunity to front Khalil's next online campaign. Drama ensues after one team is obliterated following elimination.

 Winning coach and team:  Naomi Campbell 
 Bottom two: Yaya Deng & Anouska Freedman
 Eliminated: Anouska Freedman
 Eliminated Mentor: Nicole Trunfio
 Special Guests: Gail Elliott, Steven Khalil

Episode 6: Modelling with Men 
First aired 22 April 2014

The models are challenged to a steamy photo shoot session with a male model while wearing lingerie from Dita Von Tesse's new line. During the campaign, the girls compete for the opportunity of being featured in the new Le Specs 2014 summer lookbook. Each group is allotted twenty minutes to take a group shot and one individual picture for each team member. With only two teams left in the competition, the losing mentor must nominate two of her models for elimination.

 Winning coach and team:  Cheyenne Tozzi 
 Bottom two: Brittaney Johnston & Chantal Monaghan
 Eliminated: Brittaney Johnston
 Special Guests: Jordan Coulter, Hamish Tame, Lana Rowil

Episode 7: The Race to the Final 
First aired 29 April 2014

It's the week of the semi-final, and the remaining six contestants face the last test shoot of the series. In it, they are asked to portray a wide range of emotions. For the final campaign, the girls are introduced to their client, Lexus Brand Ambassador Yolande Waldock. It is explained that each model will be tied to a cable that will enable them to jump over their partner for the shoot: a brand new Lexus CT 200h. The tight race between the teams sways if favor of team Naomi, and for the first time since the beginning of the series, team Cheyenne loses another member.

 Winning coach and team:  Naomi Campbell 
 Bottom two: Yaya Deng & Nikolina Kovacevic
 Eliminated: Nikolina Kovacevic
 Special Guests: Yolande Waldock

Episode 8: Final Walk 
First aired 6 May 2014

 Final Five: Yaya Deng & Sarah Tilleke & Olivia Donaldson &  Ruth Willmer & Chantal Monaghan
 Eliminated: Ruth Willmer & Chantal Monaghan
 Final three Yaya Deng & Sarah Tilleke & Olivia Donaldson 
 The Face Australia: Olivia Donaldson 
 Winning coach and team: Cheyenne Tozzi 
 Featured Photographer: Jez Smith
 Special Guests: Lauren Young, Alex Noonan, Emma Hogan, Zac Posen

Summaries

Elimination table

 The contestant was part of the winning team for the episode.
 The contestant was at risk of elimination.
 The contestant was eliminated from the competition.
 The contestant withdrew from the competition.
 The contestant was a Runner-Up.
 The contestant won The Face.

 Episode 1 was the casting episode. The final twelve were divided into individual teams of four as they were selected.
 In Episode 3, Susan withdrew from the competition after learning that she was pregnant 
 In Episode 5, Anouska, who was the last standing member in Nicole's team, was eliminated. Nicole was automatically disqualified as a result of having no models left to compete.
 In Episodes 6 and 7, since the competition was down to two teams, the losing coach had to nominate two girls for elimination.
 In Episode 7, the winning team for the campaign was determined by the total combined number of points allotted to each girl for her performance. Although Team Naomi had the highest combined score, Team Cheyenne's Olivia was scored the highest overall by the client despite being on the losing team.
 In Episode 8, Olivia, Sarah, and Yaya were put through to the final runway show while Chantal and Ruth were eliminated.

Campaigns
 Episode 1: Natural Beauty Shots; Self Administered 'Transformations' (Casting)
 Episode 2: Marie Claire Editorial
 Episode 3: Max Factor Commercials in a Circus.
 Episode 4: Stylerunner Photo Shoot
 Episode 5: Steven Khalil Runway Show at the Sydney Opera House
 Episode 6: Le Specs lookbook with Male Models
 Episode 7: Leaping Over a Lexus CT 200h
 Episode 8: Olay Beauty Shots for Fresh Effects

References

External links 
Official site

Australia, 1
2014 Australian television seasons